Líšná is a municipality and village in Rokycany District in the Plzeň Region of the Czech Republic. It has about 200 inhabitants.

History
The first written mention of Líšná is from 1539.

Gallery

References

Villages in Rokycany District